Royal Ceramics Lanka PLC branded as Rocell, is a Sri Lankan holding company and is also engaged in manufacturing ceramic tiles and bath ware. The company was founded in 1990 and in 1994, it was listed on the Colombo Stock Exchange. The company is one of the constituents of the S&P Sri Lanka 20 Index. LMD, a Sri Lankan business magazine placed the company 38th in the LMD 100, a list of leading listed companies in Sri Lanka. Brand Finance ranked 74th amongst the 100 most valuable brands in Sri Lanka.

History
Royal Ceramics was incorporated in 1990 and in 1994, the company was quoted on the Colombo Stock Exchange. Subsidiaries of the company, Royal Porcelain (Pvt) Ltd and Rocell Bathware Ltd commenced operations in 2002 and 2009 respectively. From 2010, the company engaged in a series of acquiring stakes in other companies. This resulted in Royal Ceramics taking control of a stake of 20% in Delmege Forsyth In 2010, 25.85% in LB Finance in 2012, and 76.54% in Lanka Ceramics PLC in 2013. The acquisition of Lanaka Ceramics PLC for LKR2.9 billion from C T Holdings gave Royal Ceramics the monopoly over the tile market in Sri Lanka. The purchase became the 13th acquisition affected by the Dhammika Perera-Nimal Perera duo. In 2014, Rocell Pty Ltd was incorporated in Australia with LKR61.5 million initial investments as a part of international expansion. A restructuring in 2017 saw Lanka Walltiles PLC being brought under the direct control of Royal Ceramics from Lanka Ceramic PLC. Royal Porcelain (Pvt) Ltd amalgamated with Royal Ceramics in 2019 and in 2021 CP Holdings was acquired.

Operations
The company plans to build a new tile manufacturing plant to raise production by 20% and aims to target the price-sensitive market segment. Currently, under the brand name Rocell, the company serve the high-end of the market. Due to 2021 Sri Lanka Debt Crisis imposed import restrictions, the overall market share of the company has increased to 75% in floortiles and 82% in walltiles. The revenue of the company has grown by 100% to reach LKR2 billion in the third quarter of 2021. The company announced an LKR11 per share second interim dividend for the year 2021 also announced a 1-for-10 share split. In the Institute of Chartered Accountants of Sri Lanka's 53rd Annual Reports Awards, the company won the silver award in the manufacturing category. The Prime Minister Ranil Wickremesinghe attended the event as the guest of honour. Royal Ceramics renamed its subsidiary, Rocell Ceramics Limited to Biscuits and Chocolate Company Limited in a bid to diversify into confectionery industry.

See also
 List of companies listed on the Colombo Stock Exchange
 List of Sri Lankan public corporations by market capitalisation

References

External links
 Official website

1990 establishments in Sri Lanka
Ceramics manufacturers
Companies listed on the Colombo Stock Exchange
Holding companies of Sri Lanka
Holding companies established in 1990
Manufacturing companies based in Colombo